Allan Jones (October 14, 1907 – June 27, 1992) was an American actor and tenor.

Jones is best remembered as the male romantic lead actor in the first two films the Marx Brothers starred in for Metro-Goldwyn-Mayer, A Night at the Opera (1935) and A Day at the Races (1937), as well as the film musicals Show Boat (1936)  and The Firefly (1937), where he introduced what became his signature song, "The Donkey Serenade".

Early years
Jones was born in Old Forge, Pennsylvania, and raised in nearby Scranton, where he graduated from Central High School. His father and grandfather were Welsh coal miners, and he worked in coal mines early in his adult life. He left that occupation to study voice at New York University.

In an interview in 1973, Jones recalled that his father and grandfather were musically talented: "My father had a beautiful tenor voice. So did my grandfather...Grandfather taught violin, voice, and piano when he could. My father sang every chance he could get and realized his ambition through me."

Stage
Jones appeared on Broadway a few times, including 1933's Roberta and the short-lived 1934 revival of Bitter Sweet after debuting in Boccacio in 1931.

Film

Jones starred in many film musicals during the 1930s and 1940s. The best-known of these were the original film version of Show Boat (1936) and The Firefly (1937) where he first performed what became his signature song: "The Donkey Serenade". Jones is best remembered today as the romantic lead opposite Kitty Carlisle and Maureen O'Sullivan, respectively, in the first two films the Marx Brothers starred in at Metro-Goldwyn-Mayer (MGM): A Night at the Opera (1935) and A Day at the Races (1937), filling the straight-man role opened by the departure of Zeppo Marx from the team.

Jones made a brief appearance in the 1936 Nelson Eddy–Jeanette MacDonald film Rose Marie, singing music from Charles Gounod's Romeo et Juliette and Giacomo Puccini's Tosca, but according to Merchant of Dreams, Charles Higham's biography of Louis B. Mayer, Eddy, who apparently considered Jones a rival and a potential threat, asked that most of Jones's footage in Rose Marie be cut, including his rendition of the great Puccini aria E lucevan le stelle, and MGM agreed to Eddy's demand. Jones's final film for MGM was Everybody Sing (1938) opposite Judy Garland and Fanny Brice, in which he introduced the pop standard "The One I Love".

In 1940, Jones moved to Universal Pictures for two musicals:  The Boys from Syracuse, with the stage score by Rodgers and Hart, and One Night in the Tropics with a score by Jerome Kern and Dorothy Fields, which was also the screen debut of Abbott and Costello. After these two films, he slipped to leads in several "B" musicals, at Paramount and Universal, including a reunion with his A Night at the Opera co-star Kitty Carlisle in Larceny with Music (1943). The same year, he made a guest appearance, as himself, in the Olsen and Johnson musical Crazy House, where he again performed "The Donkey Serenade".

Recordings
Jones recorded prodigiously throughout his career, primarily for RCA Victor. His 1938 recording of "The Donkey Serenade" ranks third among the all-time best-selling single records issued by RCA Victor.

Radio
In the mid-1940s, Jones and pianist Frankie Carle starred in the Old Gold Show on CBS radio.

Later years
Jones continued performing until the 1980s, starring in stage productions of Man of La Mancha, Paint Your Wagon, Guys and Dolls, and Carousel. In December 1980, Jones made his final screen appearance on an episode of the ABC-TV series The Love Boat also starring his son Jack Jones as his estranged son and Dorothy Lamour as his wife and Jack's mother.

Jones also bred and raised racehorses on his ranch in California.

Personal life
Jones was married four times. He was married to actress Irene Hervey from 1936 to 1957. American pop singer Jack Jones is their son. His wives included Hervey, Maria Villavincie, and Mary Florsheim (granddaughter of Milton S. Florsheim).

Death
Jones died of lung cancer at Lenox Hill Hospital in New York City in June 1992, at age 84.

Filmography

References

External links
 Martyn, Marguerite (August 19, 1932). "A New Muny Opera Hero" St. Louis Post-Dispatch

 Allan Jones Tribute
 
 
 Photographs of Allan Jones

1907 births
1992 deaths
People from Old Forge, Lackawanna County, Pennsylvania
American people of Welsh descent
Male actors from Pennsylvania
American male film actors
American male musical theatre actors
Deaths from lung cancer in New York (state)
20th-century American male actors
20th-century American singers
20th-century American male singers
Florsheim family